Michael is a 2011 Austrian drama film directed by Markus Schleinzer which resembles the famous Natascha Kampusch case from the offender's viewpoint. It premiered In Competition at the 2011 Cannes Film Festival. It is Schleinzer's directorial debut.

Plot
The film's title character is an insurance broker who lives a quiet, unassuming existence — and who secretly keeps a 10-year-old boy called Wolfgang in his soundproof basement. He sexually abuses the boy, but they otherwise have something of a father–son relationship. In the evenings, after Michael locks the door and closes the blinds, Wolfgang is allowed into the living room for dinner and to watch TV. When in hospital after an accident, Michael is in a hurry to be released and return to Wolfgang. When Wolfgang gets sick Michael digs a grave in the woods, in case Wolfgang dies. However, he recovers. The boy writes a letter to his parents, to be mailed by Michael, but Michael does not send it and lies to Wolfgang, saying his parents don't want him back.

Sometimes he takes the boy on a pleasure trip outside the town, where people do not know Michael. On one occasion he goes on a skiing trip with friends for multiple days, leaving extra food for Wolfgang, who has water, a toilet, simple cooking facilities and a TV in his room.

Seeing that Wolfgang is lonely, Michael promises to bring another child for company. Together they assemble a bunk bed in advance. Michael attempts to abduct another boy by luring him away, but the boy is called back by his father, who scolds him for walking off with a stranger. Michael tells Wolfgang that he did not succeed in providing him a friend. One day Wolfgang throws boiling water into Michael's face, nearly blinding him, but does not succeed in escaping. Due to the burns inflicted upon him in the attack, Michael takes his car and attempts to seek medical attention but dies in an accident. After the funeral Michael's mother is about to discover the boy when the film ends.

Cast
 as Michael
David Rauchenberger as Wolfgang
Christine Kain as Mother
Ursula Strauss as Sister
Victor Tremmel as Brother-in-law

Production
The film contains a scene in which Michael exposes his penis to Wolfgang. Schleinzer used an invisible split screen to ensure Rauchenberger did not have to participate in the scene.

Reception
The film was met with mixed critic ratings at the Cannes Film Festival. While Indiewire's Eric Kohn called the film "a triumph of uneasy cinema: Not since Todd Solondz's Happiness has a movie portrayed pedophilia in such uncomfortable detail", Esquires Mike D'Angelo tweeted "WHAT THE FUCK IS WRONG WITH EVERYONE IN AUSTRIA. SERIOUSLY. Once again, very well made in the approved festival style, but I understand now exactly how detractors of Funny Games felt". In Télérama, Aurélien Ferenczi wrote : "a (apparent) objectivity, the refusal of emotion, a willingness to show horror as something ordinary. We can admire the mastery, praise the coherence of the subject, or find that this mannerism is almost dated".

References

External links

2011 drama films
2011 directorial debut films
Austrian drama films
2010s German-language films
Films about pedophilia
Films about child sexual abuse